A Hawaiian haystack (also known as a "chicken sundae" or "snow on the mountain") is a type of haystack.  It is a convenience cuisine dish composed of a rice base and several toppings. It is prepared by topping rice with toppings such as chicken, chicken gravy, diced pineapple, diced tomatoes, Chinese noodles, cheese, celery, and coconut. Traditionally, each topping is prepared in its own dish and presented buffet-style, then added on top of the rice as desired.

It is popular in the Western United States both as a school lunch and as a quick, bespoke meal for family dinners.

Etymology

The dish did not originate in Hawaii, but derives its name from the Hawaiian character of staple ingredients such as coconut.

See also
 List of chicken dishes

References

American chicken dishes
American rice dishes
Latter Day Saint culture
Pineapple dishes